Krzysztof Marcinkowski (29 April 1960 – 19 December 2013) was a Polish footballer who primarily played as a midfielder.

Krzysztof Marcinkowski died on 19 December 2013, aged 53.

References

1960 births
2013 deaths
Footballers from Poznań
Polish footballers
Association football midfielders